Lagonoy, officially the Municipality of Lagonoy, is a 2nd class municipality in the province of Camarines Sur, Philippines. According to the 2020 census, it has a population of 56,714 people.

Etymology

There are two version as how Lagonoy got its name. Year 1734 when the first Spaniards in this place found a small forested area near a creek where "hagonoy", a medicinal plant grew abundantly. Because the Spaniards could hardly pronounce the word "hagonoy" with the "j" sound, with "ha" of the first syllable, they deliberately decided to change "ha" to "la". Since then, the place was known as "Lagonoy". Some of the residents also believed that the name was taken from the word "lango" meaning drunk. During fiestas and other forms or merry making, men used to drink too much "tuba" (native wine) that they become drunk or "lango" (Bikol for drunk) so that the place was called by the neighboring towns as "Lagonoy".

History

In 1734, Partido towns of Caramoan, Lagonoy, Goa and Tigaon belonged to Albay.  It was only in 1846 did Lagonoy belong to Camarines Sur.  In a long research by Norman Owen, a feud between Lagonoy Parish and Franciscan Mission of Goa and Tigaon existed.  In 1580, the administration by the Franciscans of Lagonoy Parish began until 1636, which was passed to the “mitre” of the bishop of Nueva Caceres.  In 1580 to 1850, Lagonoy gulf had been very famous because of the constant moro raids in the Partido area and all coastal towns of Albay and Catanduanes.  On the other hand, Lagonoy had other problems about the Remontados of Mt Isarog.  F. Mallari, in his book- “Ibalon under siege and storm” said they were fallen Christians and confirmed by Fray Manuel Crespo, who spent many years inducing them to return to the town and live peacefully.  Fray Matias de Valdesoto also noted in his visits to the sitios of Goa and Lagonoy that the natives planted corn, rice, root crops & tobacco.

Geography

Barangays
Lagonoy is politically subdivided into 38 barangays.

Climate

Demographics

Economy

Lagonoy is the chief supplier of "tiger grass" to the prominent "walis tambo makers" of North Luzon and some parts of Central Luzon.

Gallery

References

External links

 [ Philippine Standard Geographic Code]
Philippine Census Information
Official Site of the Province of Camarines Sur

Municipalities of Camarines Sur